Kurds in Sweden may refer to people born in or residing in the Sweden of Kurdish origin.

Most Kurdish people in Sweden live in the capital Stockholm or in Uppsala. A majority of Kurdish political refugees choose Sweden as their host country and therefore they have a cultural presence in Sweden.

Chronological Kurdish arrivals to Sweden 
1975: Huddinge becomes the first municipality offering Kurdish as a primary language.
1984: The education of Kurdish teachers in Stockholm begins.
1986-1990: The Turkish regime's mistreatment of the Kurdish population fuels immigration to Sweden.
1991-1995: The crises in Kuwait due to Iraqi invasion, the war in south Kurdistan, and mass exodus from north Kurdistan into Iran.

Political representation 
In Sweden there are several MP of Kurdish descent such Amineh Kakabaveh, Gulan Avci, Lawen Redar, Sara Gille or Kadir Kasirga. Kakabaveh was delivered the majority vote for that the Social Democrat Magdalena Andersson would become Swedish Prime Minister in 2021. As in April 2022 Sweden made an accession bid to join NATO, Turkey demanded that Sweden ends its alleged support for the Kurdish People's Defense Units (YPG) and Kurdistan Workers' Party (PKK).

Honor killings
The 26-year-old Kurdish woman Fadime Şahindal was murdered by her father in an honour killing in 2002. Kurdish organizations were criticized by prime minister Göran Persson for not doing enough to prevent honour killings. Pela Atroshi was a Kurdish girl who was shot by her uncle in a brutal honour killing. The murder of Pela and Fadime gave rise to the formation of the human rights organization Never Forget Pela and Fadime (GAPF). GAPF is a politically and religiously independent and secular nonprofit organization working against honor-related violence and oppression. The organization's name is taken from Pela Atroshi and Fadime Sahindal which is Sweden's best-known and high-profile cases of honor killings. The honor killing of Sara, an Iraqi Kurdish girl, was the first publicized honor killing in Sweden. These three prominent cases of Sara, Pela and Fadime, brought the notion of honour killings into Swedish discourse.

References

Ethnic groups in Sweden
Sweden
 
Middle Eastern diaspora in Sweden
Muslim communities in Europe
 
Kurdish people